Harpa goodwini is a species of sea snail, a marine gastropod mollusk in the family Harpidae, the harp snails.

Description

Distribution
This marine species occurs off Hawaii.

References

 Rehder, H.A., 1993. A new species of Harpa from the Leeward Islands of Hawaï. The Nautilus 106(4): 127-129
 Dance S.P. & Poppe G.T. (1999). Family Harpidae. In : A Conchological Iconography. ConchBooks. 69 pp.

Harpidae
Gastropods described in 1993